Qaleh Juq (also Romanized as Qal‘eh Jūq; also known as Khalajān, Khalajūn, Khiljān, and Qal‘eh Joq) is a village in Gavrud Rural District, in the Central District of Sonqor County, Kermanshah Province, Iran. At the 2006 census, its population was 54, in 12 families.

References 

Populated places in Sonqor County